Nothophila is a genus of crane fly in the family Limoniidae.

Distribution
New Zealand.

Species
N. fuscana Edwards, 1922
N. nebulosa Edwards, 1922

References

Limoniidae
Diptera of Australasia